Kazimierzów  is a village in the administrative district of Gmina Regnów, within Rawa County, Łódź Voivodeship, in central Poland.

The village has a population of 160.

References

Villages in Rawa County